Ádám Tóth (born 7 July 1985 in Budapest) is a Hungarian former competitive ice dancer. With Krisztina Barta, he is the 2008 Hungarian national champion and competed in the final segment at three ISU Championships – the 2006 World Junior Championships in Ljubljana, Slovenia; 2007 World Junior Championships in Oberstdorf, Germany; and 2008 European Championships in Zagreb, Croatia. They also competed in the original dance at the 2008 World Championships in Gothenburg, Sweden.

Programs 
(with Barta)

Results 
JGP: Junior Grand Prix

with Barta

References

External links

 

Hungarian male ice dancers
1985 births
Living people
Figure skaters from Budapest